Saint-Hilaire-sur-Puiseaux (literally Saint-Hilaire on Puiseaux) is a commune in the Loiret department in north-central France.

It is located about 60 km east of Orléans, on the Puiseaux river. Its neighbouring communes include Ouzouer-des-Champs, Solterre, Oussoy-en-Gâtinais, Varennes-Changy and Montcresson.

The village has a small chateau, on a square plan with corner turrets.

See also
Communes of the Loiret department

References

Sainthilairesurpuiseaux